"Runaway Horses" is a song by American singer Belinda Carlisle. It was released as the fourth single from her third album of the same name in February 1990. "Runaway Horses" reached the top 50 in Australia and the United Kingdom. The music video was directed by Greg Masuak.

Critical reception
In review of 17 February 1990 Chris Roberts of Melody Maker mocked the cover of the single and called musician as "silly old tart." The whole album he branded as "″Because the Night″ without the good bits."

Track listings
7-inch and cassette single
 "Runaway Horses"
 "Heaven Is a Place on Earth" (live at the Tower Theater, Philadelphia, May 1988)

12-inch, maxi-CD, and mini-CD single
 "Runaway Horses"
 "Heaven Is a Place on Earth" (live at the Tower Theater, Philadelphia, May 1988) – 4:53
 "Circle in the Sand" (Beach Party mix) – 7:50

Japanese mini-album
 "Runaway Horses" – 4:42
 "La Luna" (extended dance mix) – 6:45
 "Leave a Light On" (extended version) – 8:06
 "I Feel Free" (live) – 5:07
 "Circle in the Sand" (live) – 4:50
 "Heaven Is a Place on Earth" (live) – 4:52

Charts

References

1989 songs
1990 singles
Belinda Carlisle songs
Song recordings produced by Rick Nowels
Songs written by Ellen Shipley
Songs written by Rick Nowels
Virgin Records singles